Blue Danube is the fifth studio album by Azalia Snail, released in 1995 by Normal Records.

Track listing

Personnel 
Adapted from Blue Danube liner notes.

 Azalia Snail – vocals, guitar, percussion, production
Musicians
 Matt Chip – bass guitar (10)
 Pall Jenkins – bass guitar (10)
 Gary Olson – trumpet (10)
 Mike Burns – drums and engineering (9)

Production and additional personnel
 Bridget Shields – photography
 Bill Wells – engineering

Release history

References

External links 
 Blue Danube at Discogs (list of releases)

1995 albums
Azalia Snail albums
Normal Records albums